Ellen Raskin  (March 13, 1928 – August 8, 1984) was an American children's writer and illustrator. She won the 1979 Newbery Medal for The Westing Game, a mystery novel, and another children's mystery, Figgs & Phantoms, was a Newbery Honor Book in 1975.

In 2012 The Westing Game was ranked number nine all-time among children's novels in a survey published by School Library Journal, a monthly with a primarily-U.S. audience.

Life
Raskin was born in Milwaukee and grew up during the Great Depression. She was educated at the University of Wisconsin–Madison with a major in fine art. 

Raskin was an accomplished graphic artist. In New York City she worked as a commercial artist for about 15 years. Among other things she designed more than 1000 dust jackets for books including the first edition of Madeleine L'Engle's A Wrinkle in Time, the 1963 Newbery Medal winner.

In 1957, she married graphic designer Roy Kuhlman, but they soon divorced. In 1960 she married Dennis Flanagan, editor of Scientific American.

Raskin died at the age of 56 on August 8, 1984, in New York City, as a result of a connective-tissue disease.

Education 
Raskin entered the University of Wisconsin-Madison at age 18 with the intention of majoring in telegraphy. However, she suffered from severe attacks of depression, making her family life hard.

Works

Children's picture books 
Raskin wrote and illustrated twelve picture books, published by Atheneum Books except as noted.
Nothing Ever Happens on My Block, 1967
Silly Songs and Sad, Thomas Y. Crowell Co., 1967
Spectacles, 1968
Ghost in a Four-Room Apartment, 1969
And It Rained, 1969
A & The, or, William T. C. Baumgarten Comes to Town, 1970
The World's Greatest Freak Show, 1971
Franklin Stein, 1972
Moe Q. McGlutch, He Smoked Too Much, Parents, 1973
Who, Said Sue, Said Whoo?, 1973
Moose, Goose & Little Nobody, 1976
Twenty-Two, Twenty-Three, 1976

Children’s novels
Raskin wrote four novels, all published by E. P. Dutton.
The Mysterious Disappearance of Leon (I Mean Noel), 1971
Figgs & Phantoms, 1974
The Tattooed Potato and Other Clues, 1975
The Westing Game, 1978

As illustrator
Raskin also illustrated more than twenty books by other writers.
 Happy Christmas: Tales for Boys and Girls, edited by Claire H. Bishop, Ungar, 1956
 A Child's Christmas in Wales, by Dylan Thomas (1950); J. M. Dent, 1968 
 Mama, I Wish I Was Snow, Child You'd Be Very Cold, by Ruth Krauss, Atheneum, 1962
 Philosophy and History. The Ernst Cassirer Festschrift, ed. Raymond Klibansky and H. J. Paton, 1963 (second edition)
 Poems of Edgar Allan Poe, selected by Dwight MacDonald, Crowell, 1965
 We Dickinson's, by Aileen Fisher and Olive Rabe, Atheneum, 1965
 The Jewish Sabbath, by Molly Cone, Crowell, 1966
 Paths of Poetry: Twenty-Five Poets and Their Poems, ed. Louis Untermeyer, Delacorte, 1966
 Songs of Innocence (Volumes 1 & 2), by William Blake (1789, 1794), music and illustrations by Ellen Raskin, Doubleday, 1966
 D. H. Lawrence: Poems Selected for Young People, ed. William Cole, Viking, 1967
 Ellen Grae, by Vera and Bill Cleaver, Lippincott, 1967
 Poems of Robert Herrick, ed. Winfield T. Scott, Crowell, 1967
 Probability: the Science of Chance, by Arthur G. Razzell and K. G. O. Watts, Doubleday, 1967 ‡
 This Is 4: the Idea of a Number, by Razzell and Watts, Doubleday, 1967 ‡
 Books: A Book to Begin On, by Susan Bartlett, Holt, 1968
 Inatuk's Friend, by Suzanne Stark Morrow, Atlantic/Little, 1968
 Lady Ellen Grae, by Vera and Bill Cleaver, Lippincott, 1968
 A Paper Zoo: A Collection of Animal Poems by Modern American Poets, edited by Renee K. Weiss, Macmillan, 1968
 Piping Down the Valleys Wild: Poetry for the Young of All Ages, edited by Nancy Larrick, Delacorte, 1968
 Symmetry, by Razzell and Watts, Doubleday, 1968 ‡
 We Alcotts, by Aileen Fisher and Olive Rabe, Atheneum, 1968 
 Circles and Curves, by Razzell and Watts, Doubleday, 1969 ‡
 Come Along!, by Rebecca Caudill, Holt, 1969
 Shrieks at Midnight: Macabre Poems, Eerie and Humorous, edited by Sara and John E. Brewton, Crowell, 1969
 Three and the Shape of Three, by Razzell and Watts, Doubleday, 1969 ‡
 Elidor, by Alan Garner (1965), Walck, 1970 
 Goblin Market, by Christina Rossetti (1862), Dutton, 1970

 ‡ Raskin illustrated at least five volumes in a series of 32- and 48-page mathematics books by Arthur C. Razzell and Kenneth George Oliver Watts, which was inaugurated by Doubleday in 1964.

References

Further reading
 Ellen Raskin (Volume 579 of Twayne's United States Authors Series: Children's Literature), Marilynn Strasser Olson, Twayne Publishers, 1991;

External links 

 
 

1928 births
1984 deaths
 American children's writers
 American children's book illustrators
 American mystery novelists
 Newbery Medal winners
 Newbery Honor winners
University of Wisconsin–Madison alumni
 Writers from New York City
 Writers from Milwaukee
 Artists from New York City
Artists from Wisconsin
 American women illustrators
 American women novelists
 American women children's writers
 Women mystery writers
20th-century American novelists
20th-century American women writers
 Novelists from New York (state)
 Novelists from Wisconsin
20th-century American women artists